Union-Elektricitäts-Gesellschaft (UEG) was a German subsidiary of the American Thomson-Houston Electric Company. The subsidiary was established to represent the parent company's interests in Germany, Austria-Hungary, Belgium, the Netherlands, Denmark, Finland, Sweden, Norway, Russia and Turkey. The company was founded in 1882 and existed as an independent company until it was absorbed by the AEG on February 27, 1904.

Work completed
In the twelve years between 1892 and 1904, the UEG built a further 2400 kilometers of electric railways, principally in Europe, and delivered 5285 tramcars to over seventy tram companies. These included:

 1892 Bremen
 1894 Brussels, Gotha
 1895 Munich
 1896 Liège, Cairo
 1897 Aachen, Bergen
 1899 Batavia
 1901 Amsterdam
 1902 Buenos Aires

Notable staff
 Alfred Makower worked for UEG after graduating from Technical College, Charlottenburg in 1900. He moved back to England in 1902 to work for UEG's sister company, British Thomson-Houston.

References

Defunct manufacturing companies of Germany
1904 disestablishments in Germany
Manufacturing companies established in 1882
Manufacturing companies disestablished in 1904
Manufacturing companies based in Bremen (state)
German companies established in 1882